Jianying Memorial Bridge is a bridge over the Meijiang River in Meizhou City, Guangdong Province, southern China.

Bridges in Guangdong
Transport in Guangdong
Meizhou